Boku, Inc. is a mobile payments company that allows businesses to collect online payments through both carrier billing and mobile wallets, and is headquartered in San Francisco, California. Boku utilizes mobile network operator (carrier) data to enhance the security and user experience for consumers online. Boku offers its customers more than 330+ mobile payment types in over 90 countries globally, offering a bank-grade payment system.

In 2020, Boku processed over one billion billable transactions and processed over $7 billion in payments volume.

History
Boku was founded in 2009 by Mark Britto, Erich Ringewald and Ron Hirson using the combined assets of Mobillcash and Paymo. Boku raised a $13 million Series A investment from Khosla Ventures, Index Ventures and Benchmark.

A year later, in 2010 Boku raised an additional US$25 million Series C investment, led by DAG Ventures.

In 2012, Boku raised another US$35 million, Series C investment led by NEA and existing venture capital investors.

In 2016, Boku again raised an additional US$13.75 million led by a consortium of UK investors along with GMO Payment Gateway.

In total, Boku has raised more than $91M in venture capital funding from Benchmark Capital, Index Ventures, Khosla Ventures, DAG Ventures, Andreessen Horowitz, New Enterprise Associates, Telefónica, and GMO Payment Gateway.

On November 20, 2017, Boku listed its shares on the London Stock Exchange (AIM) through £125 million initial public offering.

Expansion
In 2012, Boku launched mobile wallet payments with GCash in the Philippines.

In 2013, Boku announced the acquisition of Qubecell, India's largest aggregator in carrier billing to grow India as its engineering and technology hub.

In 2014, Boku launched mobile payments for the Sony PlayStation Store, and acquired German-based carrier billing provider Mopay.

Boku acquired Mobileview, giving the company access to all four major mobile operators in Italy. In 2017 Boku exceeded $1B in annual payment volume for the first time.

In 2018, Boku acquired Danal to add mobile authentication services that secure consumer accounts and transactions

In 2020, Boku acquired Fortumo, the second largest carrier billing company and recorded revenues of $54.6 million.

More from Boku : https://www.boku.com/resources/news/

Partnerships
Boku's payments customers include Apple Inc., Google, Sony, Microsoft, Facebook, Tencent, Spotify, Electronic Arts, DAZN and Riot Games amongst others. Payments partners include mobile operators Vodafone, Verizon, Jio, Deutsche Telekom, Telefónica, Saudi Telecom (STC), SK Telecom, and mobile wallet providers LINE Pay, KakaoPay, RabbitLinePay, GCash, GoPay, OVO, Dana, GrabPay.

Products and services
Boku provides businesses with the ability to accept mobile payments (direct carrier billing and mobile wallets) online from consumers. Boku also offers a subscription bundling product, named Trident, that enables subscription services to be offered to consumers through a mobile network operator. Consumers may receive the service for free during a trial period until they are billed by the mobile operator. Additionally, Boku offers mobile identity products that utilize mobile network operator data in order for consumers to verify their identity in order to complete transactions online.

Recognition and awards
In 2011, Mobile Trax awarded Boku their Mobility Award. In 2011 and 2013, Forbes selected Boku for their 25 most promising companies in America list.

In 2014, Boku won the "Best Alternative Payments" award at 2014 Payment Awards

In 2020, Boku won the "Future Digital Awards" for Best Mobile Money Offering and Fraud Detection and Prevention Innovation.

See also
 Mobile commerce service provider
 E-commerce payment system
 List of online payment service providers
 Micropayment
 Payment service provider

External links

References

Mobile payments
Companies based in San Francisco
Companies listed on the Alternative Investment Market
Information technology companies of the United States
Financial technology companies
2017 initial public offerings